Molecular Biology of the Cell is a cellular and molecular biology textbook published by W.W. Norton & Co and currently authored by Bruce Alberts, Alexander D. Johnson, Julian Lewis, David Morgan, Martin Raff, Keith Roberts and Peter Walter. The book was first published in 1983 by Garland Science and is now in its seventh edition. The molecular biologist James Watson contributed to the first three editions.

Molecular Biology of the Cell is widely used in introductory courses at the university level, being considered as a reference in many libraries and laboratories around the world. It describes the current understanding of cell biology and includes basic biochemistry, experimental methods for investigating cells, the properties common to most eukaryotic cells, the expression and transmission of genetic information, the internal organization of cells, and the behaviour of cells in multicellular organisms. Molecular Biology of the Cell has been described as “the most influential cell biology textbook of its time”. The sixth edition is dedicated to the memory of co-author Julian Lewis who died in early 2014.

The book was the first to position cell biology as a central discipline for biology and medicine, and immediately became a landmark textbook. It was written in intense collaborative sessions in which the authors lived together over periods of time, organized by editor Miranda Robertson, then Biology Editor of Nature.

References

External links 
Official webpage
7th edition

1983 non-fiction books
American non-fiction books
English-language books
Biology textbooks
Cell biology
Molecular biology
Collaborative non-fiction books